Emperor Alexander may refer to:

 Alexander the Great (326-323 BCE), a Macedonian king who conquered the known world
 Alexander Severus (208–235), a Roman emperor (222-235) of the Severan dynasty
 Domitius Alexander, Roman usurper who declared himself emperor in 311
 Alexander (Byzantine emperor) (ca. 870–913), Byzantine emperor (912–913)
Alexander of Trebizond (ca. 1405–1459), Trapezuntine co-emperor (ca. 1451–1459)
 Alexander I of Russia (1777–1825), Russian emperor (1801–1825)
 Alexander II of Russia (1818–1881), Russian emperor (1855–1881)
 Alexander III of Russia (1845–1894), Russian emperor (1881–1894)

See also
 Emperor Alexius (disambiguation)
 King Alexander (disambiguation)
  - any of at least six vessels named for Alexander I of Russia